Tai Shue Wan is a bay to the south of Nam Long Shan, Wong Chuk Hang, Hong Kong Island, Hong Kong. It comprises the Waterfront section of Ocean Park. The Ocean Park Corporation will develop the Tai Shue Wan area into a new integrated theme zone with the main focus on an all-weather indoor cum outdoor waterpark. A Government loan of $2,290 million was approved by the Finance Committee of the Legislative Council in May 2013 to facilitate the early commencement of the project. The project was scheduled for completion in 2019.

Others
Ocean Park Hong Kong

Related
Hair Raiser
Ocean Park station
South Island line
Ocean Park Halloween Bash

References

Bays of Hong Kong
Wong Chuk Hang